Tempo Reale is an electronic music research, production, and educational centre, based in Florence, Italy. It was founded by composer Luciano Berio, who served as the centre's director from 1987 to 2000, and as honorary president until his death in 2003. The centre has celebrated its 25-year anniversary in 2012.

Notable collaborators with Luciano Berio  
 Giorgio Battistelli (Italian composer)
 Henri Pousseur (Belgian composer)
 David Moss (American composer and percussionist, founder a director of Institute for Living Voice in Antwerp)
 Renzo Piano

References

Further reading 
 Vaccari, Franco; Fagone, Vittorio; Dehò, Valerio; and Nicoletta Leonardi. Exhibitions in Real Time, Damiani, 2007. 
 Cresti, Renzo; and Eleonora Negri. Florence and the Italian music of the late twentieth century: trends in art music of Florence, Florence, LoGisma, 2004. 
 Galante, Francesco; and Nicola Sani. expanded Music: electro tracks of the millennium, Milan, Ricordi, 2000. 
 Giomi, Francesco. "Florence Tempo Reale, Fast Forward", Florence, n. 3, Florence, 2010.
 Giomi, Francesco, et al. "Live electronics in Luciano Berio's music", Computer Music Journal, vol. 27 n. 2, Massachusetts Institute of Technology Press, 2003. 
 Rizzardi, Veniero; and Angela Ida De Benedictis. New music on the radio: experience at the University of Milan 1954-1959 phonology RAI, RAI-ERI, 2000.

External links
Tempo Reale Festival

Educational institutions established in 1987
Music schools in Italy
Music education organizations
1987 establishments in Italy